Bradley Rowe (born November 20, 1955) is a former professional tennis player from the United States.

Biography
Rowe played on the Grand Prix tennis circuit between 1977 and 1979, predominantly featuring in doubles tournaments. He was runner-up in three Grand Prix events with San Jose State University teammate Hank Pfister, in San Jose and Hong Kong in 1978, then San Jose once more in 1979.

He qualified for the main singles draw of a Grand Slam tournament for the only time at the 1979 French Open. In the first round he defeated Paul Kronk, before being eliminated in the second round by eventual semi-finalist Vitas Gerulaitis.

Presently, Rowe is working as a tennis coach in California's Conejo Valley.

Grand Prix career finals

Doubles: 3 (0–3)

References

External links
 
 

1955 births
Living people
American male tennis players
Tennis people from California
San Jose State Spartans men's tennis players